Aberdeen Performing Arts is a charitable trust founded in 2004 to take over the running and management of His Majesty's Theatre, The Music Hall. In 2008, the company's portfolio grew with the acquisition of The Lemon Tree after its brief closure. The buildings are still owned by Aberdeen City Council.

References

External links

Aberdeen Performing Arts website

Culture in Aberdeen
Theatre in Scotland
Companies based in Aberdeen
2005 establishments in Scotland
British companies established in 2005
Arts organisations based in Scotland
Entertainment companies established in 2005